The Kerry-Meath rivalry is a Gaelic football rivalry between Irish county teams Kerry and Meath, who first played each other in 1939. Kerry's home ground is Fitzgerald Stadium and Meath's home ground is Páirc Tailteann; however, all but one of their championship meetings have been held at neutral venues, usually Croke Park.

While Kerry have the highest number of Munster titles and Meath are second to Dublin in Leinster, they have also enjoyed success in the All-Ireland Senior Football Championship, having won 44 championship titles between them to date.

Statistics

All-time results

Legend

Senior

References

Meath
Meath county football team rivalries